The Garden Party and Other Stories is a 1922 collection of short stories by the writer Katherine Mansfield.

Stories 

 "At the Bay"
 "The Garden Party"
 "The Daughters of the Late Colonel"
 "Mr and Mrs Dove"
 "The Young Girl"
 "Life of Ma Parker"
 "Marriage à la Mode"
 "The Voyage"
 "Miss Brill"
 "Her First Ball"
 "The Singing Lesson"
 "The Stranger"
 "Bank Holiday"
 "An Ideal Family"
 "The Lady's Maid"

Themes 
 Life
 Death
 Marriage
 Distorted Reality
 Regret/Disappointment
 Duty
 Gender

External links 

 The Garden Party and Other Stories by Katherine Mansfield available freely at Project Gutenberg
The Garden Party and Other Stories at the British Library
The Garden Party (EFL/ESL Graded Readers) - Oxford Graded Reader / Matatabi Graded Reader
 The Garden Party and Other Stories at the New Zealand Text Centre

1922 short story collections
Short stories by Katherine Mansfield
New Zealand short story collections
Constable & Co. books